Festival is a 2001 Swedish drama film directed by Karl Johan Larsson, and starring Ebba Hultkvist.

Plot 
Lina is 17 years old and is planning to visit the Arvika festival with her boyfriend Calle. However, her mother opposes the trip, but after some persuasion from Calle and her best friend Milla, Lina decides to go anyway. During the festival, a series of events comes to affect the lives of these young people.

Selected cast 
 Ebba Hultkvist - Lina
 Jesper Salén - Calle
 Källa Bie - Milla
 Martin Aliaga - Marc
 Ralph Carlsson - Calle's father
 Sverrir Gudnason - Lukas
 David Boati - Ola
 Yankho Kamwendo - Theo
 Cary Ylitalo - Bill
 Catherine Hansson - Lina's mother
 Claudia Galli - Girl at the festival

External links 

2001 films
Swedish drama films
2000s Swedish-language films
2001 drama films
2000s Swedish films